Porophyllum is a genus of flowering plants in the tribe Tageteae within the family Asteraceae known commonly as the poreleaf genus.

Poreleaf plants are subshrubs native to the Americas. Their leaves often have large glands that produce aromatic oils and give the plants a strong scent. Many species are used in cooking.

 Species
 Porophyllum amplexicaule - Coahuila, Nuevo León
 Porophyllum angustissimum  - Brazil, Argentina
 Porophyllum bahiense - Bahia
 Porophyllum cabrerae - Salta in Argentina
 Porophyllum cacalioides - Philippines
 Porophyllum calcicola - Guerrero, Morelos
 Porophyllum coloratum - Mexico
 Porophyllum crassifolium - Baja California Sur
 Porophyllum filiforme - Baja California Sur, Coahuila, Nuevo León, San Luis Potosí
 Porophyllum gracile - odora, slender poreleaf  - United States (CA NV UT AZ NM TX), Baja California, Baja California Sur, Sonora, Chihuahua
 Porophyllum greggii - United States (TX), Coahuila, 	Chihuahua
 Porophyllum hasslerianum - Paraguay
 Porophyllum lanceolatum - Bolivia, Brazil, Paraguay, Argentina
 Porophyllum leiocarpum - yerba de peo - Puerto Rico, Dominican Republic, Venezuela, Brazil
 Porophyllum linaria - pipicha - Mexico
 Porophyllum lindenii - Mexico
 Porophyllum linifolium - Bolivia, Brazil, Paraguay, Argentina
 Porophyllum maritimum - Baja California Sur
 Porophyllum obscurum  - Argentina
 Porophyllum oppositifolium - Bolivia, Brazil, Paraguay
 Porophyllum pausodynum - Sonora
 Porophyllum pringlei - Jalisco, México State, Oaxaca, Guerrero, Chiapas, Sinaloa, Morelos, Michoacán
 Porophyllum punctatum - southern Mexico, Central America
 Porophyllum pygmaeum - dwarf poreleaf - United States (NV)
 Porophyllum ruderale - pápalo, Bolivian coriander, quirquiña, yerba porosa - United States (CA AZ NM TX), Mesoamerica, West Indies, South America as far south as Paraguay
 Porophyllum scoparium - Transpecos poreleaf, hierba del venado, jarilla - United States (TX NM), Chihuahua, Coahuila, Nuevo León, San Luis Potosí, Durango, Tamaulipas, Zacatecas
 Porophyllum tridentatum - Baja California Sur
 Porophyllum viridiflorum  - México State, Morelos, Michoacán, Guerrero, Oaxaca, Guanajuato, Jalisco
 Porophyllum warnockii - México State
 Porophyllum zimapanum - Hidalgo

 formerly included
see Gynura 
 Porophyllum japonicum (Thunb.) DC. - Gynura japonica (Thunb.) Juel

Gallery

References

External links
 
 USDA Plants Profile
 Jepson Manual Treatment

Tageteae
Asteraceae genera